Etiquette for Mistresses is a 2015 Philippine romantic-drama film based on the best-selling novel of the same name written by Julie Yap-Daza and Patrick John Valencia. It features an ensemble cast including Kris Aquino, Claudine Barretto, Iza Calzado, Cheena Crab and Kim Chiu. The film tackles the lives of five successful and glamorous women whose friendship is based on their common weaknesses—they are all trapped in the prison of their hearts.

The film is also the first Filipino film to open simultaneously nationwide and worldwide in Europe, Middle East, and North America. The film opens with 15 million pesos on its opening day and received positive reviews from movie critics for its cinematography and unique storyline.

Different from most Mistress Film Genres in the Philippines the film
Focuses on different lives of the other women in the social elite world and the quest for true love through trials and tribulations

Synopsis
Chloe is a feisty mistress involved with a politician, Georgia plays the role of a chef who will eventually have a redemption arc. Ina, the former lounge singer and a neophyte who goes to Manila to seek for "true love" she believes, Stella, a lawyer who gets involved with a well-known TV personality, and Charley, a wealthy mistress, round up the roster of "other women".

Plot 
Georgia (Kris Aquino), Stella (Iza Calzado), and Charley (Cheena Crab) were watching a video scandal of a caught mistress by the wife. Charley tells them that she experienced the same scenario and instead watched the movie with her kids at the Waltermart to avoid the wife. Stella ended the conversation that she only met Ambet Viloria at home to avoid any scandal. In a lounge bar, Chloe - the most rebellious and rule breaker mistress was embarrassed in the cancellation of credit card by her lover Gabriel. In anger she throws her phone accidentally not knowing someone was hurt. Stella helps her out of prison but asks her not to tell what happened with the other girls.

Meanwhile, Georgia was tasked by her lover to train a new woman of Frank Ayson - a rich politician and boss of her lover. She reluctantly agrees and meets up with Stella in a coffee shop to get some advice before going to the airport and meet Ina, the new mistress. Ina was ecstatic at first but became quite depressed as she learned from Georgia that despite having a luxurious condo and a luxurious life, she cannot live with Frank, for whom she left her life in Cebu for. She is even more frustrated by the rules given by Georgia, which includes never calling Frank and never showing herself in front of him unless he asks her to. She ends up depressed as the days passed and overdoses herself by alcohol. Georgia rushes her to the hospital where she meets Chloe.

The next day, Georgia introduce Ina to Stella, Chloe and Charley. The girls start to form a stronger friendship and bond at SM Aura and a beauty salon using Charley's credit card. Ina meets up with Frank at a Christmas caravan with Chloe's help. Georgia angrily tells Ina that she shouldn't break her rules. Chloe discovered that Gabriel had another mistress.

In Georgia's absence, Ina stays with Charley and accompanies her in an auction but she is caught by Wang Gie's wife and has been suspended from going out. Ina chooses to stay with Stella in a court room but an accident causes Stella to fly abroad leaving Ina alone. She decides to go back to Cebu to reunite with her family, but is disappointed when she sees that they have learned to live a life without her. This convinces Ina to stay a mistress.

Ina attends Senator Adelle Ayson's birthday party to get a glimpse of Frank with Chloe's assistance. Georgia was horrified in the meeting of the two and confronts Chloe. The incident separates Chloe from the rest of the group. A news breaks out that Ambet Villoria is missing and the mistresses reunite with Stella who is hiding him in a safe house. Prior to the accident, Ambet was diagnosed with cancer and is nearing death. After a talk with Gabriel's wife, Chloe faces her friends again but nobody is interested to listen to her realization that their lovers will never choose them.

The girls learns that the police has found their location through Chloe. Charlie decides to break a rule in order for Stella and Ambet escape using Frank Ayson's influence and the public plane of Wang Gie. Georgia has one more rule for Ina and both of them leave their partners.

Chloe then accepts the job that was offered to her, Stella visits Ambet's grave, Charley returns to the Philippines with her two kids, Georgia marries a guy with twins and Ina becomes a singer and marries a handsome man.

Cast and characters

The Mistresses
Kris Aquino as Georgia Torres - The oldest among the mistresses , a chef and successful owner of a high class restaurant. She is the most proper and well mannered among the group who teaches them with the rules she kept.
Kim Chiu as Innamorata "Ina" Del Prado - a Cebuana lounge singer who fell in love with the rich politician Frank Ayson. She left her life at Cebu in exchange of living together with Frank but ended up stuck in the condo unit bought for her by Frank. She is the youngest among the mistresses.
Claudine Barretto as Chloe Zamora - The most fearless and reckless mistress. She often takes risks to meet her lover even if the wife is in the same place. She is the rule breaker among the group.
Iza Calzado as Stella Garcia - A no-nonsense lawyer and mistress of the broadcaster Ambet Villoria. She believes in true love and happy ending on mistresses.
Cheena Crab as Charley Mariquit - The richest mistress among the group who treats her friends with leisures. She is cheerful and generous and mother of two children.

Supporting cast
Helen Gamboa as Conchita San Diego - she is a philanthropist and most respected of the group of women the women look up to her and Georgia admires her
Tirso Cruz III as Ambrosio "Ambet" Villoria
Eddie Gutierrez as Gabriel "Gab" Castronuevo
Freddie Webb as Roberto "Rob" Mariano
Zoren Legaspi as Frank Ayson
Cherry Pie Picache as Betsie Galvez-Villoria
Aiko Melendez as Senator Adelina "Adelle" Ayson
Pilar Pilapil as Eliza Castronuevo
Sam Concepcion as the Young Guy
Divine Aucina as Leah (Ina's Friend)
Arci Muñoz as Amanda
Candy Pangilinan as Joy del Prado/Ina's Eldest Sister

Guest appearance
Derek Ramsay as Arthur Clemente
Piolo Pascual as Edward Cervantes
Yayo Aguila as Marla
Dexter Doria as Alicia
Kyline Alcantara as Charlie's daughter
Yuan Carido as Charlie's son
Chinggoy Alonzo† as Ramon
Menggie Cobarrubias† as Dr. Santiago
Jenny Miller as Tara
Mel Kimura as Mrs. Eroles
Manuel Chua as Manuel
Chokoleit† as Bailey
Rina Inojales as Dionesia
AJ Dee as Man in car
Ahwel Paz as Ezra
Sophia Lim as “cute” Girl in mall

Production

Filming
The production team started to shoot the film in early July 2015, the moment when Kris officially got back for the film and finished early September 2015.

Full cast and crew
Directed by: Chito Roño
Starring: Kris Aquino,  Kim Chiu, Iza Calzado, Cheena Crab, and Claudine Barretto. Together with: Divine Aucina, Cherry Pie Picache, Tirso Cruz III, Aiko Melendez, Sam Concepcion, Freddie Webb, Arci Muñoz, and Candy Pangilinan. With The Special Participation of: Pilar Pilapil and Eddie Gutierrez
Produced by: Jane Torres (associate producer), Lea A. Calmerin (line producer), Pauline Bianca Javier (line producer), Marizel Samson Martinez (supervising producer), Charo Santos-Concio (executive producer) and Malou Santos (executive producer)
Story by: Chito Roño
Screenplay by: Kriz G. Gazmen and Patrick John Valencia 
Music by: Carmina Cuya
Cinematographered by: Neil Daza (director of photography)
Art Directed by: Ana Lou Sanchez 
Production Designed by: Shari Montiague
Film Edited by: Carlo Francisco Manatad
Sound by: Nicholai Policarpio Minion (re recording designer), Darwin Dela Cruz (boom operator: AFPI TSAR), Noel Urbano (dubbing supervisor), Immanuel Verona (sound effects supervision: Wildsound Studios)
Camera and Electrical Department: Cesca Lee (camera operator), Ading Bagasona	(drone camera assistant operator: RSVP), Joel Casaol (crane operator), Gary Gardoce (additional photography)
Costume and Wardrobe Department: Bang Pineda (production stylist), Gian Laxamana (assistant stylist), Angelito Posadas	(wardrobe), (as Angge Posadas), Adonis Barsuela (wardrobe master)

Casting

The film stars Claudine Barretto, who came back to the business after two years of hiatus, this also serves as her comeback launching with Star Cinema and ABS-CBN, Kim Chiu, Iza Calzado, Cheena Crab (who also came back to the Philippines after migrating to the States) and Kris Aquino, who backed out at first  but was convinced to play the role later.

Music
 The official theme song of the film is "You Don't Own Me" performed by Lani Misalucha. The song was originally performed by Lesley Gore and was included in the soundtrack of the film The First Wives Club. It was written and composed by John Madara and Dave White.
 Kim Chiu recorded two songs for the film "Duyog" and "Labyu Langga" as part of its soundtrack.

Reception

Box-office
On its first week, the film earned P63,681,347.00 on its first week run in theaters which premiered on September 30. The film, through its 4-week run earned ₱93,060,831.36 according to Box Office Mojo.

Critical reception
The film received a lot of positive reviews because of its unique story line and cinematography. According to Rappler, ''Etiquette for Mistresses' is a breath of fresh air amidst the countless films about infidelity that offer nothing more than outrageous confrontations as cheap entertainment." says movie critic Oggs Cruz. According to Philbert Dy of www.ClickTheCity.com, "‘Etiquette for Mistresses’ is Worth Considering, Even After it Falls Apart.", he gave a rating of 3.5 out of 5 stars.

Etiquette for Mistresses received a Grade B from Cinema Evaluation Board of the Philippines.

See also
Sukob

References

External links

2015 films
Philippine romantic drama films
Films about Filipino women
2015 romantic drama films
Star Cinema films
2010s Tagalog-language films
Films based on Philippine novels
2010s English-language films